Edgar Allan Guzman (born November 20, 1988 in Pasig, Philippines) also known by his nickname and screen name EA Guzman, is a Filipino actor, and singer.

He gained popularity after he became the Mr. Pogi 2006 of Eat Bulaga!, aired on GMA Network and then stood in the network from 2006 to 2008. after establishing his career on TV5, he transferred to its rival network ABS-CBN together with Maxene Magalona in 2014. He has also worked in independent films, wherein he was dubbed as the "Prince of Philippine Independent Films", a title previously associated with Coco Martin. He returned to GMA Network in 2017 for My Korean Jagiya and later signed a contract on 2019.

Filmography

Television

Movies

Theater

Awards and nominations

References

External links 

 
 Sparkle GMA Artist Center profile
 

1988 births
Living people
Filipino male film actors
Filipino male models
Filipino television variety show hosts
GMA Network personalities
TV5 (Philippine TV network) personalities
ABS-CBN personalities
Star Magic
People from Pasig
Filipino male television actors